Concorde Capital is a limited liability investment company based in Kyiv, Ukraine. 
It offers investment banking, brokerage services and asset management in Ukraine. The company was founded in 2004 by its owner and general director, Igor Mazepa.

Brokerage activity 

2005–08 – Concorde Capital ranks among the top five stock traders, according to the PFTS, and among the leaders on the Ukrainian securities market as a whole.

2009 – Concorde Capital becomes one of the leading participants on the Ukrainian Exchange, in which it’s a shareholder. Concorde Capital is recognized top Ukrainian broker among Emerging EMEAs, based on the results of the 2009 Thomson Reuters Extel annual survey of financial markets.

2011 – Concorde Capital achieves 18th place on the UX spot market.

June 11, 2015 on the official website of Concorde Capital there was news that Concorde Private Equity is creating a company that will provide brokerage services on the forex market, for which Concorde Private Equity has entered into an agreement with Forex Trend Limited on preferential terms for former customers. On October 7, 2015, news appeared about the start of the work of the new broker PrivateFX.

2016 – Concorde Capital earns first place among the nominees for “Best sales/trader on the Ukrainian market” in the annual voting for the 2016 Cbonds Awards for the CIS region.

Investment banking activity 

The firm has attracted more than USD 5 billion using the various financial instruments for leading Ukrainian companies in the metallurgy, automobile, chemical, oil & gas, agricultural, real estate and pharmaceutical sectors.

2007–08 – Concorde Capital finishes first place by number of M&A deals in Ukraine among Ukrainian and global investment banks, and finishes first based on number of M&A deals in the financial sector among CIS countries in 2007, as determined by MergerMarket and DealWatch.

Research 

2007–08 – Concorde Capital’s research department is recognized first in Ukraine, based on the annual Thomson Reuters Extel survey.

2009 – Concorde Capital ranks among the top three research teams in Ukraine.

2016 – Concorde Capital finishes first place in the Extel survey among its nominees for “Emerging EMEA: Ukraine: Country Research” as determined by a survey of employees of international hedge funds, private equity funds and public companies.

References

External links
 Concorde Capital site

Ukrainian companies established in 2004
Financial services companies of Ukraine
Investment banks
Companies based in Kyiv